Teafuaono or Entrance Island is an islet of Nukufetau, Tuvalu.

References

Islands of Tuvalu